The 2007 ISSF World Cup was held in the fifteen Olympic shooting events. Four qualification events were held in each event, spanning from March to July, and the best shooters qualified for the ISSF World Cup Final in October, which was held in Bangkok, Thailand for the rifle and pistol events, and in Belgrade, Serbia for the shotgun events.

Notable about this season is that Europe only had one world cup in the rifle and pistol events (Munich), as Milan was left out in favour of a more worldwide spread of venues.

Winners

Triple winners 
  (STR3X20 and AR40)
  (SP)

Double winners 
  (FR60PR)
  (FR3X40 and AR60)
  (RFP)
  (TR75)
  (FP)
  (FR3X40 and FR60PR)
  (RFP)
  (AR40)
  (AP60)
  (AR60)
  (SK75)
  (DT150)
  (SK125)

See also 
 2007 World Shotgun Championships
 Shooting at the 2008 Summer Olympics – Qualification

External links 
 Full results at ISSF TV

ISSF World Cup
World Cup